The Haenel Schmeisser is a 6.35mm caliber, semi-automatic pocket pistol designed by Hugo Schmeisser, and manufactured by the gun manufacturer C. G. Haenel. Two models were produced, named the Model 1 and Model 2 respectively.

References 

Firearms by Hugo Schmeisser
.25 ACP semi-automatic pistols